Long Point Lighthouse is an active Canadian lighthouse located outside Crow Head on North Twillingate Island off the northeast coast of Newfoundland. The lighthouse, completed in 1876, attracts thousands of tourists each year and is historic to the town of Twillingate.

Keepers
Samuel Roberts 1875–1893 
R.E. Roberts 1893–1896 
R.S. Roberts 1897–1912 
William Freeman 1913-1932?
John and George Roberts 1932
Edgar Sharpe 1952–1980 
Allan Roberts 1969–1984 
Barry Porter 1984-1988 and 2003
Jack May 1988 – 2004

See also
 List of lighthouses in Newfoundland and Labrador
 List of lighthouses in Canada

References

External links

 Aids to Navigation Canadian Coast Guard

Lighthouses completed in 1876
Lighthouses in Newfoundland and Labrador
Lighthouses on the Canadian Register of Historic Places